Béla Volentik (5 December 1907 – 27 October 1990) was a Hungarian footballer and football manager. He played for Nemzeti FC, Újpest, FC Lugano and for the Hungarian national team, capping once.

He started his coaching career in Switzerland with FC Aarau and went on to coach FC St. Gallen, BSC Young Boys, FC Lugano and Lausanne Sport. He then has a stint with the Luxembourg national football team before coming back to Hungary where he coached Bp. Haladás, MTK twice, leading them to the 1964 European Cup Winners' Cup Final and Pécsi Dózsa. He also coached Bulgaria and BFC Dynamo.

References

1907 births
1990 deaths
Hungarian footballers
Hungary international footballers
Újpest FC players
FC Lugano players
Hungarian football managers
BSC Young Boys managers
FC Lausanne-Sport managers
MTK Budapest FC managers
Berliner FC Dynamo managers
FC Aarau managers
FC St. Gallen managers
FC Lugano managers
Bulgaria national football team managers
Luxembourg national football team managers
Expatriate football managers in Bulgaria
Expatriate football managers in Switzerland
Expatriate football managers in East Germany
Hungarian expatriate sportspeople in East Germany
Burials at Farkasréti Cemetery
Hungarian expatriate football managers
Association football midfielders
Pécsi MFC managers
People from Szolnok
Nemzeti Bajnokság I managers
Sportspeople from Jász-Nagykun-Szolnok County
Hungarian expatriate sportspeople in Switzerland
Hungarian expatriate sportspeople in Luxembourg
Hungarian expatriate sportspeople in Bulgaria